Gălănești is a commune located in Suceava County, Bukovina, Romania. It is composed of two villages, Gălănești and Hurjuieni. It also included Voitinel village until 2004, when it was split off to form a separate commune.

References

Communes in Suceava County
Localities in Southern Bukovina
Duchy of Bukovina